ISO 259 is a series of international standards for the romanization of Hebrew characters into Latin characters, dating to 1984, with updated ISO 259-2 (a simplification, disregarding several vowel signs, 1994) and ISO 259-3 (Phonemic Conversion, 1999).

ISO 259 
ISO 259, dating to 1984, is a transliteration of the Hebrew script, including the diacritical signs (niqqud) used for Biblical Hebrew.

The dagesh (dot inside the letter) is always transcribed with an overdot: ḃ, ġ, ż, etc. The apostrophe (‎) in the table above is the Hebrew sign geresh used after some letters to write down non-Hebrew sounds:  ,  ,  , etc.

ISO 259-2 
ISO 259-2 simplifies the diacritical signs for vowels of ISO 259, and is designed for Modern Hebrew.

The dagesh is not transcribed excepted in the indicated cases. The apostrophe (‎) in the table above is the Hebrew sign geresh used after some letters to write down non-Hebrew sounds.

ISO 259-3 
ISO 259-3 is Uzzi Ornan's romanization, which reached the stage of an ISO Final Draft (FDIS) but not of a published International Standard (IS). It is designed to deliver the common structure of the Hebrew word throughout the different dialects or pronunciation styles of Hebrew, in a way that it can be reconstructed into the original Hebrew characters by both man and machine.

It is neither a character-by-character transliteration nor a phonetic transcription of one pronunciation style of Hebrew, but is instead phonemic from the view point that all the different dialects and pronunciations of Hebrew through the generations can be regarded as different realizations of the same structure, and by predefined reading rules every pronunciation style can be directly derived from it.

Each consonant character in the Hebrew script is converted into its unique Latin character. ISO 259-3 has five vowel characters, corresponding to the five vowel phonemes of Modern Hebrew: a, e, i, o, u. In addition there is a sixth sign for denoting the vowel  or  that is written followed by ⟨⟩ in common Hebrew spelling: .

The dagesh forte (gemination in Biblical Hebrew) is transcribed with a double consonant. Non-phonemic vowels are ignored, such as:
 schwa , which is however transcribed with an underscore (_) between two identical consonants in order to distinguish it from a geminate consonant:   "boys" = yladim,   "Hallelujah" = hal_luyah,
 "furtive" pataḥ  (an unaccented  sound before some final laryngeal consonants):   "breeze, spirit" = ruḥ, but ISO 259-3 also allows -- (in section 5., "SIMPLIFIED VERSION") -- the transcription with a for non-linguistic purposes: ruaḥ.

References

See also
List of ISO transliterations
ISO 233 for Arabic transliteration

Hebrew alphabet
00259
00259

ceb:Sulat Inebreo#Romanisasyon